China–El Salvador relations are the bilateral relationships between the People's Republic of China and Republic of El Salvador. China maintains an embassy in San Salvador and El Salvador maintains an embassy in Beijing.

History 
Diplomatic ties between China and El Salvador were first established in 1933 when the Nationalist government held control of Mainland China while Taiwan was part of the Empire of Japan. El Salvador recognized the People's Republic of China on August 21, 2018. China's State Councillor and Foreign Minister Wang Yi held talks with El Salvador Foreign Minister Carlos Castaneda. They signed a joint communique on the establishment of diplomatic relations, deciding to recognize each other and establish diplomatic relations at an ambassadorial level from the date of the communique's signing. The government of El Salvador severed diplomatic ties with Taiwan in 2018 during the administration of Salvador Sánchez Cerén.

Trade 
China exported US$1.5 billion of goods to El Salvador and imported US$105 million in 2019. The major commodities exported by China to El Salvador are machinery, textiles, plastic and rubbers, and various miscellaneous items. While the major commodities that El Salvador exports to China are electrical capacitors, raw sugar, and coffee. Between 1995 and 2019, exports from El Salvador to China have increased at an annualized rate of 14.7%, while exports from China to El Salvador have increased at an annualized rate of 16.6%.

Development projects 

In 2018, Asia Pacific Xuanhao (APX), a company with links to the People's Liberation Army and People's Armed Police, announced a plan to lease 225 hectares within and around the port at La Unión. The purpose of the lease remains undisclosed.

Upon Nayib Bukele's visit to China in 2019, he had signed a series of MoUs with Xi Jinping, in which China would promise El Salvador a total of US$500 million in development projects. These projects include a new national football stadium, a new US$40 million national library, a tourist pier in La Libertad and Ilopango, and US$200 million on the "Surf City" project, thereby involving El Salvador in China's Belt and Road Initiative.

Nayib Bukele announced on Twitter that a cooperation project granted by the People's Republic of China will have US$54 million new national library be built in El Salvador. The Salvadoran President later announced on December 30, 2021, that the 50,000-capacity Estadio Nacional de El Salvador will be built to replace Estadio Cuscatlán as El Salvador's national football stadium, at a cost of US$500 million, in collaboration with China.

Foreign aid 
In 2019, China offered El Salvador around US$150 million in social projects and 3,000 tons of rice to thousands of Salvadorian victims to droughts.

The COVID-19 pandemic in El Salvador saw vaccine diplomacy increase between China and El Salvador. El Salvador received from China 150,000 vaccine doses of the CoronaVac vaccine donated by China, on top of 2 million Sinovac vaccines that the Central American nation had purchased.

Culture 
In November 2019, El Salvador permitted the opening of its first Confucius Institute at the University of El Salvador.

References 

 
China
El Salvador